New Politics can refer to:

Politics
New Politics (1950s), the ideology of the U.S. Democratic Party during the 1950s
New Politics Initiative in Canada
New Politics Network in the UK
New Politics Party in Thailand
New Politics (Ukraine), a political party in Ukraine
New Politics (political non-profit) in U.S., Bi-partisan 527 organization

Publications
New Politics (magazine), a longstanding socialist journal published in the United States

Music
New Politics (band), a rock band from Denmark
New Politics (album), the first studio album by New Politics